Edgar Bundy  (1862 in Brighton – 1922 in London) was an English painter.

Biography
Bundy had no formal training but learned some of his craft at the studio of Alfred Stevens. Bundy specialised in historical paintings in oil and watercolour, usually in a very detailed and narrative style, a genre which was very popular in the Edwardian time Bundy lived in. He exhibited at the Royal Academy in 1915 and at the Paris Salon in 1907. In the Tate Gallery is his Royal Academy painting of 1905 entitled The Morning of Sedgemoor depicting the Duke of Monmouth's rebels resting in a barn before the battle.

Influences in Bundy's work include Pre-Raphaelites such as John Millais, William Morris and the works of John Ruskin.

His daughter Dorothy married the painter Richard Barrett Talbot Kelly in 1924

Notes

External links 

 
 Profile on Royal Academy of Arts Collections

19th-century English painters
English male painters
20th-century English painters
1862 births
1922 deaths
Artists from Brighton
Associates of the Royal Academy
19th-century English male artists
20th-century English male artists